The Prague Papers on the History of International Relations is a biannual peer-reviewed academic journal published on behalf of the Institute of World History (Faculty of Arts, Charles University in Prague) by the Faculty of Arts Press – Charles University. It was established in 1997 and covers the history of international relations. The journal publishes articles in English, French, German, Russian, and Spanish. Since 2006 the journal cooperates with the Institute of East European History (Faculty of Historical and Cultural Sciences, University of Vienna).

Editors 
The editors-in-chief are Václav Drška (Institute of World History, Faculty of Arts, Charles University) and Arnold Suppan (Institute of East European History, University of Vienna).

Abstracting and indexing 
The journal is abstracted and indexed in EBSCO databases and ERIH PLUS.

See also 
 List of history journals

References

External links
 

Publications established in 1997
History journals
Multilingual journals
International relations journals
Charles University
Biannual journals
1997 establishments in the Czech Republic